Prorella protoptata is a moth in the family Geometridae first described by James Halliday McDunnough in 1938. It is found in the US in south-western Texas.

The wingspan is about 16 mm. Adults have been recorded on wing from May to June.

References

Moths described in 1938
Eupitheciini